The Overlook Historic District encompasses a historic residential area north of downtown Waterbury, Connecticut.  Roughly bounded by Calumet Street to the north, Columbia Avenue to the east, Cables Avenue and Tower Road to the south, and Willow an Fisk Streets to the west, it includes the city's finest concentration of turn-of-the century residential architecture, which was developed as its first major planned residential subdivision.  The district was listed on the National Register of Historic Places in 1988.

Description and history
The Overlook residential district was a combination of farmland and country estates of wealthy Waterbury businessmen prior to its development beginning in the late 19th century.  In 1897, real estate developer Cornelius Cables began purchasing land in the area, and made a comprehensive plan for residences catering mainly to middle and upper-class families.  Columbia Avenue, a boulevard with a grass median, was the central feature of his plans, with three distinct subareas with differing lot and house sizes.  Roads were laid out somewhat informally, respecting the hilly terrain.  The area was built out by 1930.

About 350 of these are residences, and only five are institutional buildings; the remainder are outbuildings such as garages that date to the period of development. Most of the houses are of wood frame construction, and the majority are Colonial Revival in style. Other period styles are well represented, including the Queen Ann and Craftsman. The non-residential buildings include a church, school, and fire station.

See also

National Register of Historic Places listings in New Haven County, Connecticut

References

National Register of Historic Places in New Haven County, Connecticut
Victorian architecture in Connecticut
Historic districts on the National Register of Historic Places in Connecticut
Waterbury, Connecticut